Debrešte is a village in a highland area in the municipality of Dolneni, North Macedonia. It is the largest settlement in the municipality in terms of population.

Demographics
Debrešte has traditionally been inhabited by a Macedonian Muslim (Torbeš) population that speaks the Macedonian language. 
Between 1954 - 1960 large scale migration from Debrešte by Macedonian Muslims to Turkey occurred, while Orthodox Macedonians from the Poreče region and Slavic Muslims from the Sandžak settled in the village. Slavic Muslims from Sandžak, known as Sandžakli settling in Debrešte were not well received by the local population which forced them to move to neighboring villages, mainly to Lažani where their numbers are high. Macedonian Muslims from Debrešte refer to the surrounding Christian population as Makedonci (Macedonians) and those Orthodox Macedonians refer to them as Turci (Turks) due to they being Muslims. The village also has an ethnic Albanian population.

According to the 2021 census, the village had a total of 2.600 inhabitants. Ethnic groups in the village include:

Turks 1.941
Albanians 528
Macedonians 81
Bosniaks 3
Others 46

References

Villages in Dolneni Municipality
Macedonian Muslim villages
Turkish communities in North Macedonia
Albanian communities in North Macedonia